Neil Cole (born 1 March 1972) is an English television presenter, comedian, radio broadcaster and actor.

Early life
Cole was born in Bristol in 1972, and attended King Edward Grammar School in Chelmsford. He studied English and French Literature at Bristol University.

Stand-up comedy
As a comedian, Cole was half of successful but short-lived stand-up double act, Hitchcock's Half Hour, which won the coveted Hackney Empire New Act of the Year competition in 1998. They supported Harry Hill and Ennio Marchetto in West End Theatres, and appeared on BBC1's The Stand Up Show, BBC Radio 4's Loose Ends and contributed to Channel 4's The Eleven O'Clock Show before splitting up in 2000.

Cole returned to the stand-up circuit as a solo comic in February 2007, and supported Russell Brand on his UK Tour over the summer 2007, as well as MCing live music events at the Royal Albert Hall. In March 2010, Cole's debut hour-long solo stand-up show – "Neil By Mouth" – premiered at the Glasgow International Comedy Festival, and ran throughout the Edinburgh Festival Fringe in August 2011, at Cabaret Voltaire. He was one of the first UK comedians to perform at the improvised stand-up phenomenon Set-List, in Edinburgh and subsequently in London.

Cole was a founder member of London sketch team The Pros From Dover alongside Phil Whelans and Richard Glover, and occasionally still guests with them.

Television
Cole was the series writer for Ultimate Rush, an adventure sports documentary series produced by Red Bull Media House. He is also the live reporter and host for FIA World Rallycross Championship. Other work includes hosting a show about roller-coasters for National Geographic Channel called Man Vs Ride and hosting Red Bull Race Day 2019. He produced and reported for Formula E, World Series by Renault and World Touring Car Championship. Before that, Cole presented the World Rally Championship on Dave during 2008–2010. He has previously worked for BBC, ITV, Channel 4, MTV, AXN, UKTV, Extreme Sports Channel, The Audi Channel and Sky One.

He has reported on location from major international events, including the London 2012 Olympic Games, the 2006 FIFA World Cup, the Race of Champions, the MTV Europe Music Awards, the World Rally Championship and World Cup Skateboarding.

Cole has also hosted (and often associate-produced) further shows including:
 (for MTV) Select MTV, Euro Top 20, mtv:new, World Chart Express, MTV News and his own weekly live music and chat show, The Fridge.
 (for AXN) AXN Road Trip, Shakedown (also shown on ITV4 and Men & Motors, twice nominated for a Royal Television Society Award 2006 & 2007).
 (for ITV2) Bedrock.

Acting
Cole won the Best Actor award at the Unrestricted View Horror Film Festival 2016 for his role as Pete in British comedy horror feature film Stag Hunt, starring alongside Mackenzie Astin.

Recent work includes character roles in the Dark Ditties series on Amazon Prime. He also played a Radio DJ in feature film Borrowed Time and Captain William in feature film Richard the Lionheart: Rebellion

In theatre, Cole recently played Meatball in the World Premiere of Lesley Ann Albiston's new play A Slice of Eel Pie. He has appeared in leading roles including: Puck in A Midsummer Night's Dream, Hal in Loot, Nero in Britannicus, Wilson in The Ruffian on the Stair, Willie in Blue Remembered Hills, Mephistopheles in Dr Faustus, and various characters in Mamet's Edmond. He has played The Darkness in cult comedy Umbrage Swain and the Magical Diamond of Ramtutiti in London's Off-West End.

Radio
After several years hosting various shows on London 104.9 Xfm (including breaking new Scandinavian bands like Peter, Bjorn & John and The Concretes in his feature Northern Xposure), Cole was the daytime DJ for NME Radio from launch until summer 2009. He has also guest-starred in two Sapphire & Steel audio plays, All Fall Down and Dead Man Walking.

References

External links
 Official site
 Spotlight CV
 Review on Chortle
 
 2011 Interview with The Humourdor

1972 births
People educated at King Edward VI Grammar School, Chelmsford
Living people
Male actors from Bristol
English male film actors
English male comedians
English male television actors
Actors from Chelmsford
Alumni of the University of Bristol